"Hero" is the first single of the 2009 album Awake by the American Christian rock band Skillet and is the first track on the album. The song talks about mankind's need for a hero with the hero being Jesus Christ. It is the fourth single by Skillet to be released to physical media. The single sold 12,000 copies in its first week.

Promotion
It was used in a promo on NBC for the 2009 NFL Kickoff game between the Pittsburgh Steelers and the Tennessee Titans, as well as the Week 17 Sunday Night Football game between the Cincinnati Bengals and the New York Jets and the NFL Wild Card Saturday games, featuring the rematch between the Bengals and the Jets, as well as the rematch from Week 17 between the Philadelphia Eagles and the Dallas Cowboys. "Hero" was included on the WWE SmackDown vs. Raw 2010 video game, and was used in the trailers of the 20th Century Fox film Percy Jackson & the Olympians: The Lightning Thief.

Credits
John Cooper – lead vocals, bass
Korey Cooper – rhythm guitar, keyboards
Ben Kasica – lead guitar
Jen Ledger – drums, vocals

Charts

Music video
The music video for "Hero" was directed by the Erwin Brothers. Coming out shortly after the "Monster" video, which was shot by the Erwins at roughly the same time, "Hero" is the album's second music video. Although the site was for fan club members only, pictures of the video shoot could've be viewed on panheads.com.

Awards
The song was nominated for both "Rock Recorded Song of the Year" and "Short Form Video of the Year" at the 41st GMA Dove Awards.

Certifications

References

External links
 

2009 singles
Skillet (band) songs
Songs written by John Cooper (musician)
Atlantic Records singles
Songs written by Korey Cooper
Song recordings produced by Howard Benson
2009 songs
Lava Records singles
Ardent Records singles
Songs about Jesus